The 1999–00 Codan Ligaen season was the 43rd season of ice hockey in Denmark. Ten teams participated in the league, and the Frederikshavn White Hawks won the championship. Gladsaxe SF was relegated to the 1. division.

First round

Second round

Group A

Group B

Playoffs

Relegation

External links
Season on hockeyarchives.info

Dan
Eliteserien (Denmark) seasons
1999 in Danish sport
2000 in Danish sport